Sandy Point is an unincorporated community in Westmoreland County, in the U. S. state of Virginia.

References

Unincorporated communities in Virginia
Unincorporated communities in Westmoreland County, Virginia
Virginia populated places on the Potomac River